The Turkish Mathematical Society (TMD) is a Turkish organization dedicated to the development of mathematics in Turkey. Its members are individual mathematicians living in Turkey or Turkish mathematicians living abroad.

Goals 
The Society seeks to serve mathematicians particularly in universities, research institutes and other forms of higher education. Its aims are to
 Promote mathematical research in Turkey,
 Concern itself with the broader relations of mathematics to society,
 Assist and advise on problems of mathematical education,
 Try to establish solidarity among mathematicians,
 Cooperate with or join national and international institutions with common aims,
 Raise public awareness of mathematics.
The TMD is a Member of the International Mathematical Union (IMU), the European Mathematical Society (EMS) and the Mathematical Society of South Eastern Europe (MASSEE). In 2012, the society published a report of education and research policy in Turkey in relation to mathematics, and has attempted to influence national policy since.

History 
The Turkish Mathematical Society was founded in 1948, by eminent researchers of the Istanbul University and Istanbul Technical University, including Cahit Arf, Mustafa İnan, and Nazım Terzioğlu. It became a full member of IMU in 1960 and was raised to Group II in 2016. TMD became a member of the EMS in 2008 and of the MASSEE in 2014. The Society is located in Istanbul and has had a branch in Ankara since 1992. An annual symposium has been organized every year for the last 30 years. A popular quarterly mathematics magazine, has been published since 1991.

Presidents 
Until 1976: Nazim Terzioglu
1976–1982: Cahit Arf
1982–1986: Fikret Kortel
1986–1989: Cahit Arf
1989–2008: Tosun Terzioğlu
2008–2010: Ali Ülger
2010–2016: Betül Tanbay
2016–present: Attila Aşkar

Structure and governance 
The governing body of the TMD is its General Assembly, consisting of all full members. The General Assembly meets every two years, and appoints the Executive Committee members who are responsible for the running of the society.

See also 
 List of mathematical societies

References

External links 
 The Turkish Mathematical Society
 The European Mathematical Society Homepage
 The International Mathematical Union Homepage
 The Mathematical Society of South-Eastern Europe Homepage
 Matematik Dünyası (quarterly mathematics magazine - in Turkish)

Mathematical societies
Scientific societies based in Turkey